Khatauli Assembly constituency is one of the 403 constituencies of the Uttar Pradesh Legislative Assembly, India. It is a part of the Muzaffarnagar district and one of the five assembly constituencies in the Muzaffarnagar Lok Sabha constituency. First election in this assembly constituency was held in 1967 after the "Delimitation Order" (Delimitation Commission 	- 1967) was passed in 1967. In 2008, after the "Delimitation of Parliamentary and Assembly Constituencies Order, 2008" was passed, this constituency was assigned identification number 15.

Wards and areas

Extent of Khatauli Assembly constituency is  Khatauli, Mansoorpur, PCs Jansath, Talada, Tisang, Mehalaki, Khedachogawan, Basayach, Nangalachadhav of Jansath KC, Khatauli NPP, Khatauli (CT) & Jansath NP of Jansath Tehsil.

Members of the Legislative Assembly

Election results

2022 by-election

2022

2017

2012

See also

Government of Uttar Pradesh
Muzaffarnagar Lok Sabha constituency
List of Vidhan Sabha constituencies of Uttar Pradesh
Muzaffarnagar district
Sixteenth Legislative Assembly of Uttar Pradesh
Uttar Pradesh Legislative Assembly
Uttar Pradesh

References

External links
 

Assembly constituencies of Uttar Pradesh
Politics of Muzaffarnagar district
Constituencies established in 1967
1967 establishments in Uttar Pradesh